Jeremy Howick is a Canadian-born, British residing clinical epidemiologist and philosopher of science. He researches evidence-based medicine, clinical empathy and the philosophy of medicine, including the use of placebos in clinical practice and clinical trials. He is the author of over 100 peer-reviewed papers, as well as two books, The Philosophy of Evidence-Based Medicine in 2011, and Doctor You in 2017. In 2016, he received the Dawkins & Strutt grant from the British Medical Association to study pain treatment. He publishes in Philosophy of Medicine and medical journals. He is a member of the Sigma Xi research honours society.

Early life and education
Howick, a native of Montreal, Canada, is a graduate of Westmount High School. He holds a Bachelor of Arts in Engineering from the Dartmouth College, and graduate degrees from The London School of Economics and the University of Oxford. His PhD in Philosophy of medicine at the London School of Economics was conducted under the supervision of Professors Nancy Cartwright and John Worrall, with a thesis entitled Philosophical essentials in evidence-based medicine: Evaluating the epistemological role of double blinding and placebo controls, published in 2008. He is the Director of the Oxford Empathy Programme at the Faculty of Philosophy, University of Oxford.

International Rowing
As a freshman at Dartmouth College, Howick learned to row. He subsequently competed in internationals for Canada at the 1994 World Championships, and won a silver medal at the 1994 Commonwealth Games. He also competed in The Boat Race 1996 representing Oxford.

Professional background
Howick has worked at the University of Oxford, including at the Centre for Evidence-Based Medicine since 2007. Together with Muir Gray, he founded the Oxford Empathy Programme, and the Oxford Philosophy and Medicine Network.His main post now is at the University of Leicester where he is the director of the Stoneygate Centre for Excellence in Empathic Healthcare.

Broadcasting
Howick designed a trial of placebo treatments for back pain for a BBC Horizon documentary.

Research
Howick is known for his research which combines Philosophy of medicine with medical research (especially Evidence-based medicine, which he mostly defends. Howick's book, "The Philosophy of Evidence-Based Medicine" came to define a sub-discipline within the Philosophy of Medicine and has been used to develop a course on the History and Philosophy of Medicine at the Oxford Centre for Evidence-Based Medicine. The book is a critical defense of the Evidence-based medicine Hierarchy of evidence.

His work on placebo effects includes a systematic review suggesting that the magnitude of placebo effects is similar to the magnitude of drug effects, most notably for treating pain (although the latter includes the placebo effect). and another suggesting that 'honest' placebos (that patients know are placebos) can also be effective.

His research currently focuses on empathy, where his main contribution has been to evaluate empathy in healthcare the same way drugs are evaluated, namely with systematic reviews of randomised trials.

His research has been translated for popular audiences in his book Doctor You.

References

External links

Find an Expert: Dr Jeremy Howick

Dartmouth College alumni
British epidemiologists
Philosophers of science
21st-century British philosophers
People from Quorn, Leicestershire
Living people
Academics of the University of Oxford
Academics of the University of Leicester
Placebo researchers
British medical researchers
Alumni of the London School of Economics
Year of birth missing (living people)